William James Hubard (1807 – February 1862) was British-born artist who worked in England and the United States in the 19th century. He specialized in silhouette and painted portraits.

Biography
Hubard arrived in the United States from England in 1824.

In 1825–1826 he worked in Boston, Massachusetts, setting up an exhibition known as the "Hubard Gallery" at Julien Hall (corner Congress and Milk Streets). At the time Hubard would have been about 18 or 19 years old. A local newspaper reported "there is a great variety of pictures—likenesses, groups of animals, landscape scenery, caricatures, &c.—all cut with a simple pair of scissors, without the aid of any machinery whatever, and which a spectator might, at a hasty glance, take for painting." He received raves in the press: "He exercises his scissors with so much dexterity and skill, that an accurate profile, even of the most 'unmeaning face,' can be procured in twenty-five seconds, without the use of steam." Local resident John George Metcalf visited the gallery in 1825, and wrote in his diary:

Hubard Gallery. This is a collection of cuttings of black paper of all the shapes and figures that can possibly be imagined. The figures after being cut out, are arranged and pasted on white paper which are skilfully and tastefully placed about the Hall. This Astonishing genius is a native of Shropshire in England and is now about fifteen years of age. Here, and all done with only a pair of common scissors, you can see the stately structures of Westminster Abbey, the Catholic Church at Glasgow and others all with their due proportion of light and shade. Here Napoleon has burst from the cearments of the grave and is upon his warhorse, as when on the bloody fields of Austerlitz and Marengo. Franklin too has come back, and stands for the patriot and Philosopher as when at the court of London he said "his Master shall pay for it." Kings and princes have left their gilded mausoleums, and at the will of Master Hubard are set up to be gazed at by clown and cobler. Besides these graver scenes we have the lighter ones of Life. Here Doctor Syntax and his whole Tour can be found and all his scenes of fun and merriment stand forth to be looked and laughed at. Fiddlers, Beggars, Bellmen, Irishmen and others ad infinitum, all as natural as life, all the creation of a pair of common scissors, attract the attention and excite the admiration of many a gazer. Horses and Dogs, pigs and pussies, and all that "sort o' thing," can here be found from the size of a thumb-nail to that of a platter. In fine here any one, if he is not made by one of Nature's journeymen, can find fun and frolic enough to last a week.

Hubard later moved to Richmond, Virginia where he married Maria Mason Tabb, the daughter of wealthy clients in nearby Gloucester County. He also became friends with Mann S. Valentine, II who supported and promoted his work.

On January 14, 1853, he was given exclusive license by the Virginia General Assembly to make bronze copies of the marble statue of George Washington by French sculptor Jean-Antoine Houdon, producing them as of 1856, with a total of six in all.

In February 1862, he was killed in an accidental explosion while making munitions in Richmond for the Confederate States of America during the American Civil War.

Works by Hubard reside in the collections of Historic New England, the Smithsonian, and The Valentine in Richmond.

Selected works

References

Further reading
 
 
 Louise F. Catterall. "Tabb-Hubard Letters." Virginia Magazine of History and Biography, Vol. 56, No. 1 (Jan., 1948), pp. 57–65
 William James Hubard, 1807–1862: A concurrent survey and exhibition, January, 1948. Virginia Museum of Fine Arts, 1848
 Albert Ten Eyck Gardner. "Southern Monuments: Charles Carroll and William James Hubard." Metropolitan Museum of Art Bulletin, New Series, Vol. 17, No. 1 (Summer, 1958), pp. 19–23.
 Penley Knipe. Shades and Shadow-Pictures: The Materials and Techniques of American Portrait Silhouettes. 1999. http://cool.conservation-us.org/coolaic/sg/bpg/annual/v18/bp18-07.html

External links

 WorldCat
 http://www.apva.org/marshall/collection/ldr_hubard.php
 Time (magazine)
 Museum of Fine Arts, Boston. Margaret Oliver Colt and Mary Devereux Colt in the Gardens at "Green Mount," Baltimore, 1830. By Hubard.
 http://digitalgallery.nypl.org/nypldigital/id?EM12221
 http://collections.si.edu/search/results.jsp?q=record_ID:npg_NPG.78.266
 Metropolitan Museum of Art, NY. Portrait of Charles Carroll of Carrollton, c. 1830
 http://richmondthenandnow.com/Newspaper-Articles/William-James-Hubard-Silhouette.html

1807 births
1862 deaths
English portrait painters
American portrait painters
19th-century English painters
English male painters
19th-century American painters
American male painters
Silhouettists
Accidental deaths in Virginia
English emigrants to the United States
Artists from Richmond, Virginia
Painters from Virginia
Industrial accident deaths
19th-century American male artists
19th-century English male artists